Glūda Station is a junction railway station on the Jelgava – Liepāja and Glūda–Reņģe railways in Latvia.

References 

Railway stations in Latvia
Railway stations opened in 1887